Savage Dog is a 2017 American action film written and directed by Jesse V. Johnson and starring Scott Adkins.

Cast
Scott Adkins as Martin Tillman
Marko Zaror as Rastignac
JuJu Chan as Isabelle
Cung Le as Boon
Vladimir Kulich as Steiner
Keith David as Valentine
Charles Fathy as Amarillo
Matthew Marsden as Harrison
Sheena Chou as Samsip-Sam
Luke Massy as The Champ
Aki Aleong as Tribal Chieftain

Reception
The film has a 69% rating on Rotten Tomatoes based on 13 reviews.

References

External links
 
 

2017 action films
American action films
2017 films
Films set in Southeast Asia
Films set in 1959
2010s English-language films
Films directed by Jesse V. Johnson
2010s American films